Apichad Thaveechalermdit  (born 10 January 1965), is a Thai former football midfielder who played for Thailand in the 1996 Asian Cup.

Honours

Bangkok Bank
 Thai Premier League: 1996

Thailand
 Sea Games: 1993, 1995
 ASEAN Football Championship: 1996
 Asian Games 4th: 1998
 King's Cup: 1994
 Independence Cup (Indonesia): 1994

External links

1965 births
Living people
Apichad Thaveechalermdit
Apichad Thaveechalermdit
Place of birth missing (living people)
Apichad Thaveechalermdit
Southeast Asian Games medalists in football
Association football midfielders
Competitors at the 1993 Southeast Asian Games
Competitors at the 1995 Southeast Asian Games
Footballers at the 1994 Asian Games
Apichad Thaveechalermdit